Hertfordshire was a constituency of the European Parliament located in the United Kingdom, electing one Member of the European Parliament by the first-past-the-post electoral system. Created in 1979 for the first elections to the European Parliament, it was abolished in 1999 on the adoption of proportional representation for European elections in the United Kingdom. It was succeeded by the East of England region.

Boundaries

On its creation in 1979, it consisted of the parliamentary constituencies of Hertford and Stevenage, Hertfordshire East, Hertfordshire South, Hertfordshire South West, St Albans, Watford and Welwyn and Hatfield.

After the 1984 boundary changes based on the new UK parliamentary constituencies created in 1983, it consisted of the constituencies of Broxbourne, Hertford and Stortford, Hertsmere, St. Albans, South West Hertfordshire, Watford and Welwyn Hatfield. Stevenage was transferred to Bedfordshire South.

1994 saw further boundary changes and the constituency now consisted of Hertsmere, North Hertfordshire, St. Albans, South West Hertfordshire, Watford, Welwyn Hatfield and West Hertfordshire. Broxbourne as well as Hertford and Stortford were now part of Essex West and Hertfordshire East. North Hertfordshire and West Hertfordshire had previously been part of Bedfordshire South.

The entire area became part of the East of England constituency in 1999.

MEPs

Election results

References

External links
 David Boothroyd's United Kingdom Election Results 

European Parliament constituencies in England (1979–1999)
Politics of Hertfordshire
1979 establishments in England
1999 disestablishments in England
Constituencies established in 1979
Constituencies disestablished in 1999